Ermal Peçi is an Albanian journalist and television presenter. He hosted his first television program in 2006. In February 2023 Ermal Peçi moved to RTSH, hosting 'Më prit në fundjavë'. 'Friends of Europe' chose him as the Albanian representative at the European Young Leaders 2023 in Brussels, Belgium.  

Peçi is mostly known for his shows  Abc e pasdites, Trokit, Nje kat me lart, Euro Beat, Heart Attack,.  

From 2006, he hosted his shows in Arberia National Television, Agon Channel, ABC, IN tv Albania, RTSH.  

Ermal Peçi was part of Dance with me Albania 6 in RTV Klan (September – December 2019). 

Peçi has also participated in hosting or promoting other music and cultural events throughout Albania, reaching a diverse broadcast and social media audience. In 2022 he hosted 'Colour Day Festival' and 'Korca Beer Fest'. 

He became well known for his reality show in Agon Channel Heart Attack and for interviews with popular artists in ABC e pasdites, Nje kat me lart and Trokit.

TV shows
 Më prit në fundjavë ( 2023, RTSH)
  (2020 - 2022, ABC News Albania)
 Dance with me Albania 6 (2019 VIP Cast, RTv Klan)
 Trokit (2018 - 2019, IN Tv Albania)
  (2018, IN Tv Albania)
 Euro Beat (2018, IN Tv Albania)
 Heart Attack (2013-2014 , Agon Channel)
  (2013, Agon Channel)
  (2013, Agon Channel)
 Start (2008 - 2010, Ora News)

Festivals

 Tirana Summit 2023
 Colour Day Festival 2022
 Korca Beer Fest 2022
 ABBA Tribute 2022
 World of Dance Albania 2019 - 2020

References 

Albanian television presenters
Albanian journalists
Living people